Kevin Burns (born 7 July 1960) is a New Zealand former cricketer. He played 58 first-class matches for Otago between 1980 and 1992. He was born at Invercargill.

References

External links
 

1960 births
Living people
New Zealand cricketers
Otago cricketers
Cricketers from Invercargill